The following is a list of pipeline accidents in the United States in 1998. It is one of several lists of U.S. pipeline accidents. See also list of natural gas and oil production accidents in the United States.

Incidents 

This is not a complete list of all pipeline accidents. For natural gas alone, the Pipeline and Hazardous Materials Safety Administration (PHMSA), a United States Department of Transportation agency, has collected data on more than 3,200 accidents deemed serious or significant since 1987.

A "significant incident" results in any of the following consequences:
 fatality or injury requiring in-patient hospitalization
 $50,000 or more in total costs, measured in 1984 dollars
 liquid releases of five or more barrels (42 US gal/barrel)
 releases resulting in an unintentional fire or explosion

PHMSA and the National Transportation Safety Board (NTSB) post incident data and results of investigations into accidents involving pipelines that carry a variety of products, including natural gas, oil, diesel fuel, gasoline, kerosene, jet fuel, carbon dioxide, and other substances. Occasionally pipelines are repurposed to carry different products.

The pipe had been damaged by third party activity.
 1998 On February 14, a landslide during a serious storm ruptured a Shell Oil Company pipeline in Ventura County, California, spilling about 10,000 gallons of crude oil.
 1998 On March 4, a backhoe hit a natural gas pipeline in Attleboro, Massachusetts. The gas later exploded and burned, killing 2 people, injuring 6 others, and causing extensive property damage. 
When the pipe was excavated, it was found to be buckled and cracked. The NTSB found that the pipeline ruptured because of settlement of soil and trash underneath the pipeline.
 1998 On April 4, a tow of the M/V Anne Holly, comprising 12 loaded and 2 empty barges, which was traveling northbound on the Mississippi River through the St. Louis Harbor, struck the Missouri-side pier of the center span of the Eads Bridge. Three of these barges drifted toward the President Casino on the Admiral, a permanently moored vessel below the bridge on the Missouri side of the river. A natural gas leak resulted when the natural gas supply line to the Admiral was severed in the course of the accident. When the line broke, natural gas began escaping. Although the escaping gas did not ignite, the gas leak had continued for about 3 hours before being stopped.
 1998 In South Riding, Virginia, on July 7, a natural gas explosion and fire destroyed a newly constructed residence in the South Riding community in Loudoun County, Virginia. A family consisting of a husband and wife and their two children were spending their first night in their new home at the time of the explosion. As a result of the accident, the wife was killed, the husband was seriously injured, and the two children received minor injuries. Five other homes and two vehicles were damaged. The cause of the gas leak was inadequate separation between the electrical service line and the gas service line which was damaged during installation of the electrical line, allowing release of natural gas into the basement.
 1998 On July 14, an earth mover hit an 8-inch LPG pipeline, near Placedo, Texas. The operator of the equipment was killed.
 1998 A bulldozer operator on July 14 hit an 8-inch LP gas pipeline in Placedo, Texas. The gas caught fire and the operator was burned to death. 100 acres of nearby brush were burned from the fire. 2 charred pipeline warning signs were within 10 yards of the incident.
 1998 Lightning struck a Florida Gas Transmission Co. natural gas compressor plant near Perry, Florida on August 13, causing an explosion and massive fire. A second explosion later followed, injuring 5 firefighters & pipeline company employees. 6 nearby homes were also destroyed.
 1998 On September 22, an  crude oil spill from a Lakehead (now Enbridge) pipeline near Plummer, Minnesota was caused by an excavator hitting that pipeline.
 1998 On October 1, a break in a BP pipeline near the Mississippi Canyon in the Gulf of Mexico, off the Louisiana coast, spilled about 155,000 gallons of crude oil.
 1998 In October, a tank sprung a leak at a Koch Industries Pipeline crude oil receiving station. More than 30,300 gallons spilled out, much of it flowing into the creek, a tributary of the San Antonio River, in Karnes County, Texas.
 1998 On December 3, crews installing a new pipeline hit a natural gas liquids (NGL) pipeline near Moab, Utah, with escaping product igniting near Highway U-191, injuring 4 pipeline workers. Asphalt in the road was melted, and traffic was stopped.
 1998 On December 8, a gas transmission pipeline exploded and burned, forcing a dozen families within a 2-mile radius of the fire to evacuate, near Essex Township, Illinois. The fire was 15 stories tall. There were no injuries.
1998 St. Cloud explosion: On December 11, while attempting to install a utility pole support anchor in a city sidewalk in St. Cloud, Minnesota, a communications network installation crew struck and ruptured an underground, 1-inch, high-pressure plastic gas service pipeline, thereby precipitating a natural gas leak. About 39 minutes later, while utility workers and emergency response personnel were taking preliminary precautions and assessing the situation, an explosion occurred. As a result of the explosion, 4 persons were fatally injured; 1 person was seriously injured; and 10 persons, including 2 firefighters and 1 police officer, received minor injuries. Six buildings were destroyed. Damage assessments estimated property losses at $399,000.

References

Lists of pipeline accidents in the United States